Valery Petrov may refer to

 Valeriy Petrov, a Ukrainian footballer and coach from Crimea
 Valeri Petrov, a pseudonym of Bulgarian poet and screenplay writer Valeri Nisim Mevorah